The Ministry of Foreign Affairs (MRE; ; literally: Ministry of External Relations) conducts Brazil's foreign relations with other countries. It is commonly referred to in Brazilian media and diplomatic jargon as Itamaraty, after the palace which houses the ministry (originally in Rio de Janeiro, and currently in a second location which also bears this name in Brasília). Since 1 January 2023, the minister responsible is Mauro Vieira.

The Ministry of Foreign Affairs operates the Rio Branco Institute and the Alexandre de Gusmão Foundation.

History

There were three relevant moments that defined the Ministry of Foreign Affairs as the institution that would later be established. The first was the signature of the 1750 Spanish–Portuguese treaty, which re-established the borders set in the Treaty of Tordesillas. This moment was not a foreign issue policy of Brazil per se, but was instead a pursuit of interests by the Portuguese in their largest colony. There was, however, a notable Brazilian in the diplomatic corps, Alexandre de Gusmão, who directed the Portuguese foreign policy of trying to separate the Americas from the subject of European successions. The height of Gusmão's diplomatic effort was the signing of the Treaty of Madrid of 1750, in which territorial issues in South America were resolved.

The second relevant historic moment was the transfer of the Portuguese Court to Brazil in 1808 as a result of the Napoleonic Wars, when the capital of the Portuguese Empire and all its bureaucracy were transferred to Rio de Janeiro. The transfer of the Portuguese Court heavily influenced the Brazilian institutions that would later form.

Finally, there was the participation of the Ministry of Foreign Affairs in the process of recognizing Brazilian independence. This moment's relevance surpassed the creation of Brazilian diplomatic institutions and for the first time tested the negotiation skills of Emperor Peter I's diplomatic corps, which achieved recognition from every world power.

From that moment on and since its inception in 1822, Itamaraty has defined some of its basic principles of action such as the peaceful resolution of principles and non-intervention. With the conclusion of World War II and the creation of the United Nations in 1945 the ministry consolidated Brazil's presence in international forums.

Notable diplomats in the history of Itamaraty include the Viscount of Uruguay, the Baron of Rio Branco and Osvaldo Aranha.

Main mission

The main mission of Brazilian diplomatic embassies and consulates abroad is to promote the country's interests, provide assistance to Brazilian citizens and support the activities of Brazilian companies in foreign markets.

Diplomatic missions

Permanent diplomatic missions are meant to carry out representation, negotiation and information activities, as well as the protection of Brazilian interests with governments of other states and international organizations. Brazil has an extensive diplomatic network, consisting of over 220 overseas missions:
131 embassies
52 consulates-general, consulates, and vice-consulates
1 commercial office
1 representative office
15 delegations
100+ honorary consulates

See also

ApexBrasil
List of Ministers of Foreign Affairs of Brazil
Mercosur
Secretary General of Foreign Affairs of Brazil
Federal institutions of Brazil
Brazilian diplomatic missions
Foreign relations of Brazil
Community of Portuguese Language Countries
List of diplomatic missions in Brazil
Visa requirements for Brazilian citizens

Notes and references

External links
Official website of the Ministry of Foreign Affairs 
Official website of the Ministry of Foreign Affairs 
Official website of the Ministry of Foreign Affairs (Archive) 
Official website of the Instituto Rio Branco, the Brazilian Diplomatic Academy 

Foreign relations of Brazil
Brazil
Foreign Affairs
Brazil, Foreign Affairs
1736 establishments in Brazil